Chlormint is a product line of chewing gum and breath mint candies made by Perfetti Van Melle, India.  It was used in a show called "Deal Ya No Deal" as one of the prizes, and it was a best mint selling company in India at its time.

See also
 List of breath mints
 List of chewing gum brands

External links
 
 Perfetti Van Melle brand information for Chlormint

Chewing gum
Perfetti Van Melle brands
Breath mints
Indian confectionery
Indian brands